Our Kind of People is an American drama television series that premiered on Fox on September 21, 2021, as a fall entry during the 2021–22 television season. The series, created by Karin Gist and Wendy Calhoun, is inspired by the 1999 book of the same name by Lawrence Otis Graham. The final episode aired on January 25, 2022; in May 2022, the series was cancelled after one season.

Premise
Set in Oak Bluffs, Massachusetts, the series follows the rich and powerful Black elites as they come to play and summer as they did for over 5 decades. However, this summer, Angela Vaughn, a strong-willed single mother, sets out to regain her family's name after it was damaged by  rumors and a shocking revelation, while simultaneously attempting to make an impact with her groundbreaking hair care line that accentuates the underlying natural beauty of Black women, but she soon discovers a dark secret about her own mother's history that will turn her world upside down and shake up this community forever. The show takes a thrilling exploration of race and class in America and an unapologetic celebration of Black resilience and achievement.

Cast and characters

Main

 Yaya DaCosta as Angela Vaughn
 Nadine Ellis as Leah Franklin Dupont
 Lance Gross as Tyrique Chapman
 Rhyon Nicole Brown as Lauren Dupont
 Alana Kay Bright as Nikki Vaughn
 Kyle Bary as Quincy Dupont
 Joe Morton as Teddy Franklin
 Morris Chestnut as Raymond Dupont

Recurring
 Raven Goodwin as Josephine, Angela's old college roommate and close friend who is an accepted member of The Bluffs community. (Season 1) 
 Nicole Chanel Williams as Taylor Woods, a fun-loving and open girl. 
 L. Scott Caldwell as Olivia Sturgess Dupont, Raymond's mother, an elegant society matron who pegs Angela as a disruptor in their tight-knit community 
 Debbi Morgan as Patricia “Aunt Piggy” Williams, Angela's uninhabited aunt who has secrets of her own, including a connection to Oak Bluffs from many years ago. 
 Melissa De Sousa as Alex Rivera, an accomplished financial reporter and Raymond's ex-wife 
 McKinley Freeman as Nate Robinson, Nikki's father who spent 17 years in jail 
 Ashley Nicole Blake as Young Eve
 Susan Spain as Rose Franklin, Teddy's wife and Leah's mother (Season 1) 
 Kay-Megan Washington as Jackie, Franklin family maid
 Ahmarie Holmes as Sloane, Jackie’s granddaughter who is secretly seeing Quincy
 Jeff Hephner as Jack Harmon, Raymond’s partner at Darmon

Episodes

Production

Development
In September 2017, it was announced that an adaptation of Lawrence Otis Graham's 1999 book Our Kind of People: Inside America's Black Upper Class, pitched by Wendy Calhoun was in development at Fox. In August 2019, writing on the series was taken over by Lee Daniels and Karen Gist. The outbreak of the COVID-19 pandemic in March 2020 resulted in the series being pushed to off-cycle development. In September 2020, it was confirmed that a writer's room had been opened for the series and that the series was in contention for a straight-to-series order for the 2021–22 season. On March 29, 2021, the project was officially handed a series order by Fox. The opening theme for the series, "Our Kind of People," is performed by independent recording artist Tinashe. On May 13, 2022, Fox canceled the series after one season.

Casting
On May 12, 2021, Yaya DaCosta was the first to be cast in the series, in the role of Angela Vaughn. She was joined the following week by Morris Chestnut, in the role of Raymond Dupont. At the end of May 2021, Alana Bright was cast in a starring role.
In June 2021, LeToya Luckett, Rhyon Nicole Brown, Joe Morton, Kyle Bary, and Lance Gross were cast in a starring roles while Debbi Morgan and L. Scott Caldwell were cast in recurring roles. In July 2021, Nadine Ellis joined the cast in a recasting, replacing Luckett. In August 2021, Raven Goodwin and Nicole Chanel Williams were cast in recurring roles. In October 2021, Melissa De Sousa and McKinley Freeman joined the cast in recurring capacities.

Filming
Principal photography for the series began on July 7, 2021, and concluded on November 24, 2021, in Wilmington, North Carolina.

Release
The series premiered on September 21, 2021, as a Tuesday night entry at 9 p.m. on Fox after the hit drama The Resident. On July 27, 2021, Fox released the first official teaser for the series.

International
In Canada, the series airs on CTV in a simulcast with Fox. It has been dumped to CTV 2 after 2 episodes due to low ratings. The series also premiered with the first 3 episodes on Disney+ via the streaming hub Star as an original series in selected countries. In Latin America, the series premiered as a Star+ original. In India, the series streams on Disney+ Hotstar, with episodes being made available the day after their U.S. broadcast.

Reception

Critical response
The review aggregator website Rotten Tomatoes reports a 33% approval rating with an average rating of 6.1/10, based on 12 critic reviews. The website's critics consensus reads, "Our Kind of People has its share of soapy seductions, but overly familiar plots and a general lack of tension strand an attractive cast in a beautifully empty drama." Metacritic, which uses a weighted average, assigned a score of 53 out of 100 based on 11 critics, indicating "mixed or average reviews".

Ratings

References

External links

2020s American drama television series
2020s American black television series
2021 American television series debuts
2022 American television series endings
English-language television shows
American black television series
Fox Broadcasting Company original programming
Mass media portrayals of the upper class
Serial drama television series
Television series based on books
Television series about families
Television shows set in Massachusetts
Television series by 20th Century Fox Television
Television series by Fox Entertainment
Television shows filmed in North Carolina
Television shows filmed in Wilmington, North Carolina